Johann Friedrich Ludwig Volckmann (22 January 1758 – 15 October 1815) was a German theologian, lawyer and animal rights writer.

Volckmann studied theology (1777–1780) and law in Leipzig. He worked in his hometown of Arnstadt as a bailiff and later as a government and court advocate. In 1794, he founded the Verein der Literaturfreunde zu Arnstadt (Association of Friends of Literature in Arnstadt).

In 1799, Volckmann authored Menschenstolz und Thierqualen, an early animal rights work. It was republished in 2018. In the book Volckmann stated that animals possess "memory, phantasy, moral sense" and some degree of rationality.
 
Volckmann argued that if man showed a higher admiration for the talents of animals, he would abstain from practicing cruelty. Volckmann was one of the earliest writers to apply the term "rights" to animals.

He married Wilhelmine Albertine Friederike Schöneweck in 1804.

Selected publications

Menschenstolz und Thierqualen (translated Human Pride and Animal Torture, 1799)

See also

Herman Daggett
Wilhelm Dietler

References

1758 births
1815 deaths
18th-century German Christian theologians
18th-century German lawyers
German animal rights scholars